The Tiger Who Came to Tea is a short children's story, first published by William Collins, Sons in 1968, written and illustrated by Judith Kerr. The book concerns a girl called Sophie, her mother, and an anthropomorphised tiger who invites himself to their afternoon tea and consumes all the food and drink they have. The book remains extremely popular more than 50 years after it was first published, and a theatrical adaptation of the story has been produced. A television adaptation of the book aired on UK's Channel 4 on Christmas Eve 2019 at 7:30pm GMT.

The original artwork for the book is held by Seven Stories, a children's literature centre in the UK.

The Tiger Who Came to Tea is one of the best selling children's books of all time.

Plot

A little girl named Sophie is having tea with her mother in their kitchen, when she hears the doorbell ring. Soon, Sophie and her mother are joined for tea by a kind tiger who drinks all the tea before eating all the food in the house and then drinking everything, even draining all the water from the taps. After the tiger leaves, Sophie's father comes home from work and suggests that they all go out and have a lovely meal in a cafe. The following day, Sophie and her mother go out to buy some more food, including a big tin of tiger food. Despite the tin of tiger food being requested by Sophie, the tiger never returns (hence the tiger plays a trumpet with the word "Goodbye" coming out of the end of it).

Inspiration
Kerr invented the story after visiting a zoo with her three-year-old daughter. She said her husband Nigel Kneale was away making a film and "it felt a bit lonely and we wished somebody would come. We'd been to the zoo so it seemed reasonable for a tiger to come. We both thought they were incredibly beautiful." She told the story many times before making it into a book. The book took a year to write and illustrate. 

Former Children’s Laureate Michael Rosen has drawn parallels between the book and the author’s life. Kerr spent her early years in Berlin just before the start of the Third Reich and her father was on a death list because of his opposition to the Nazis. Her family fled Germany and most of their property was seized in 1933 when she was nine years old. Rosen claims the tiger could be based on her memory of the past threat: something that could have disrupted her life as a young child and taken everything the family owned. He said "Judith knows about dangerous people who come to your house and take people away. She was told as a young child that her father could be grabbed at any moment by either the Gestapo or the SS - he was in great danger.  So I don't know whether Judith did it consciously or not - I wouldn't want to go there - but the point is he's a jokey tiger, but he is a tiger." Kerr, however, stated more than once that the tiger represents nothing more than a tiger, and had no relevance to her upbringing.

Foreign language editions

This book has been produced in Braille. It is also published in German with the title Ein Tiger kommt zum Tee. It has been adapted into Welsh, entitled Y Teigr a Ddaeth i De. In this version, the little girl is renamed Catrin. There is also a Japanese edition "おちゃのじかんにきたとら" (Ocha no Jikan ni Kita Tora). The book was also translated into Hebrew, with the title ״Hatigris Sheba Lishtot Te” (הטיגריס שבא לשתות תה). A Brazilian Portuguese version, under the title O tigre que veio para o chá da tarde, was also released.

Theatre adaptation
The book has been adapted for stage with music by David Wood. The original production featured the actors Devon Black, Alan Atkins and Abbey Norman.

Television adaptation
A television adaptation of the book aired in the UK on Channel 4 on Christmas Eve 2019 and featured the voices of David Walliams as the narrator, David Oyelowo as the tiger, Clara Ross as Sophie, Maria Darling as the boy from the grocer's, Tamsin Greig as Sophie's mother, Benedict Cumberbatch as Sophie's father and Paul Whitehouse as the milkman. It was also released on DVD by Universal Pictures Home Entertainment on 2 February 2020.

See also

Mog, a series of children's books by the same author.

References

External links
Browse inside The Tiger Who Came to Tea at HarperCollins Publishers

1968 children's books
Books about tigers
Books by Judith Kerr
British children's books
British picture books
Children's fiction books
HarperCollins books
English-language books